Roberto Madrigal García (born 20 April 1941) is a Mexican diver. He competed at the 1960 Summer Olympics and the 1964 Summer Olympics.

Notes

References

External links
 

1941 births
Living people
Mexican male divers
Olympic divers of Mexico
Divers at the 1960 Summer Olympics
Divers at the 1964 Summer Olympics
Divers from Mexico City